Anatolie Cîrîcu (born 14 September 1988) is a Moldovan weightlifter.

Cîrîcu is the champion of the 2012 European Weightlifting Championships for the 94 kg category. He also participated in the 2011 European Weightlifting Championships, where he won the silver medal.

Doping 
At the 2012 Summer Olympics he originally won the bronze medal in the men's 94kg category, lifting a total of 407 kg.  On 27 July 2016, the IWF reported that, in the IOC's second wave of doping re-sampling, Cîrîcu had tested positive for the steroid dehydrochlormethyltestosterone. In November 2016, he was stripped of his Olympic medal. He is banned by the IWF until 11 May 2023.

Achievements

References

External links

1988 births
Living people
Moldovan male weightlifters
Weightlifters at the 2012 Summer Olympics
Olympic weightlifters of Moldova
European champions in weightlifting
Doping cases in weightlifting
Moldovan sportspeople in doping cases
Competitors stripped of Summer Olympics medals
People from Cahul
European Weightlifting Championships medalists
20th-century Moldovan people
21st-century Moldovan people